IODA  is an abbreviation that may refer to:

 Independent Online Distribution Alliance, a digital distribution company
 International Optimist Dinghy Association, see Optimist (dinghy)